Constantin von Jascheroff (born 5 March 1986) is a German actor. He appeared in more than seventy films since 1995.

Filmography

German Dub

References

External links 

1986 births
Living people
German male film actors
German male voice actors